Sheykh Ali Asghar (also Romanized as Sheykh ‘Alī Aşghar) is a village in Hoseynabad Rural District, in the Central District of Shush County, Khuzestan Province, Iran. At the 2006 census, its population was 1,450, in 234 families.

References 

Populated places in Shush County